David Craig (born 16 February 1953) is a former Australian rules footballer who played with North Melbourne in the Victorian Football League (VFL).

Notes

External links 

Living people
1953 births
Australian rules footballers from Victoria (Australia)
North Melbourne Football Club players